Nigeria competed at the 1964 Summer Olympics in Tokyo, Japan.  The nation won its first Olympic medal.

Medalists

Bronze
 Nojim Maiyegun  Boxing, Men's Light Middleweight

References
Official Olympic Reports
International Olympic Committee results database

Nations at the 1964 Summer Olympics
1964
1964 in Nigeria